Scoparia augastis is a moth in the family Crambidae. It was described by Edward Meyrick in 1907. This species is endemic to New Zealand.

The wingspan is 28–29 mm. The forewings are light fuscous, irrorated with whitish. The costa and all veins are marked by somewhat darker fuscous lines. The hindwings are very pale brassy-ochreous. Adults have been recorded on wing in March on flowers of Senecio species.

References

External links
 Scoparia augastis in Species Id

Moths described in 1907
Moths of New Zealand
Scorparia
Taxa named by Edward Meyrick
Endemic fauna of New Zealand
Endemic moths of New Zealand